Johan Ludvig Nils Henrik Vibe (23 November 1840-25 March 1897 ) was a Norwegian topographer, writer, magazine editor and theatre director.

He was born in Kristiania (now Oslo), Norway.
He co-founded the satirical magazine Vikingen in 1862. From 1877 to 1879 he served as artistical director for Christiania Theater. Among his works are Alexander Møllers erindringer from 1875, and contributions to the multi-volume series Norges land og folk.

References

External links
 

1840 births
1897 deaths
Norwegian topographers
Norwegian male writers
Norwegian magazine editors
Norwegian theatre directors